Victorious Kidss Educares (VKE) is an IB World School located in Kharadi, Pune, India. It was established by Dr. Robbin Ghosh in January 1997. The school is driven by the motto of ‘Learning to Love to Learn’, and strives to create ‘lifelong learners’.

It is a co-educational school from Playgroup up to Grade 12th.

The school is authorised by International Baccalaureate for the Primary Years Programme, the Middle Years Programme, and the Diploma Programme.

See also
List of schools in Pune

References

External links
 

Schools in Pune
International Baccalaureate schools in India
Educational institutions established in 1997
1997 establishments in Maharashtra